The 2019 Thai League 4 Bangkok Metropolitan region is a region in the regional stage of the 2019 Thai League 4. A total of 13 teams located in Central and Bangkok Metropolitan Region of Thailand will compete in the league of the Bangkok Metropolitan region.

Teams

Number of teams by province

Stadiums and locations

League table

Standings

Positions by round

Notes:* The reserve of T1 and T2 teams or also known as team (B) could not qualified and relegated, so that the teams in lower or upper positions would be qualified or relegated.

Results by round

Results
For the Bangkok metropolitan region, a total 24 matches per team competing in 2 legs.

Attendances

Overall statistical table

Attendances by home match played

Source: Thai League
Note: Some error of T4 official match report 6 April 2019 (Rangsit University 0–2 Police Tero (B)).
 Some error of T4 official match report 18 May 2019 (Air Force Robinson 0–1 Rangsit University).
 Some error of T4 official match report 1 June 2019 (Grakcu Sai Mai United 4–0 Bankunmae).
 Some error of T4 official match report 21 July 2019 (Siam 0–2 Pathumthani University).
 Some error of T4 official match report 31 July 2019 (Air Force Robinson 0–2 Thonburi University).
 Some error of T4 official match report 11 August 2019 (Rangsit United 0–1 Police Tero (B)).
 Some error of T4 official match report 21 August 2019 (Pathumthani University 3–3 SCG Muangthong United (B)).
 Some error of T4 official match report 31 August 2019 (Air Force Robinson 1–1 Air Force United (B)).
 Some error of T4 official match report 31 August 2019 (Pathumthani University 2–0 Bankunmae).

Season statistics

Top scorers by team

See also
 2019 Thai League 1
 2019 Thai League 2
 2019 Thai League 3
 2019 Thai League 4
 2019 Thailand Amateur League
 2019 Thai FA Cup
 2019 Thai League Cup
 2019 Thailand Champions Cup

References

External links
 Official website of Thai League

4